Fateme Ekhtesari, also Fatemeh Ekhtesari, (born 1986) is an Iranian poet. Ekhtesari lived in Karaj and she writes in Persian. In 2013, she appeared at the poetry festival in Gothenburg (Göteborgs poesifestival). After she arrived back in Iran she was imprisoned and later released on bail. Her verdict came in 2015 when she was sentenced to 99 lashes and 11.5 years imprisonment for crimes against the Iranian government, for immoral behaviour and blasphemy.

Biography
Ekhtesari is also a midwife, and she writes about labours, pregnancies and abortions.

Her first collection of poems called  was published in 2010. It was later retracted and the publication ended when it was discovered that she had filled in censored words by hand before the publication of her work. , her second book, is still waiting on approval to be published by the Iranian government as of October 2015.

She was the chief editor of the postmodern magazine Hamin farad bud  which has since been cancelled. Ekhtesari participated in a project called En motståndsrörelse på mitt skrivbord where six Persian and six Swedish poets met. It was documented by the magazine Kritiker in 2013.

The rapper Shahin Najafi, whose music has been banned in Iran, has used some of Ekhtesari's poems in his songs.

Criminal case 

In 2013, Ekhtesari was among the invited poets who appeared at the Gothenburg poetry festival. After her visit in Sweden she was arrested when she was about to travel to Turkey together with poet Mehdi Moosavi and imprisoned at the Evin prison in Tehran. Her Facebook account was hacked and her blog was closed.

On 13 January 2014, Svenska PEN (the Swedish PEN), Sveriges Författarförbund (The Swedish Writers' Union) and Göteborgs poesifestival protested to demand the release of Ekhtesari and other Iranian prisoners. The protest took place outside Iran's embassy in Lidingö. On 14 January 2014, Ekthesari and Mehdi Moosavi were both released on bail.

On 12 October 2015, the sentence against Ekhtesari was declared. She was to be lashed 99 times and to serve 11.5 years imprisonment. Ekthesari and Moosavi were both sentenced for crimes against the Iranian government, for immoral behaviour and blasphemy. In Ekhtesari's case, her sentence includes seven years for "insulting the sacred", three years for the claimed publication of indecent photos online and eighteen months for spreading propaganda critical of the Iranian government. The 99 lashes are punishment for "illicit relations".

Escape
In January 2016, Ekhtesari told the Associated Press that she and Moosavi had fled Iran. For safety reasons, she declined to provide any more details.

References

External links

Living people
1986 births
20th-century Iranian poets
21st-century Iranian poets
21st-century Iranian women writers
Place of birth missing (living people)
Iranian women poets
People from Kashmar
Iranian emigrants to Sweden
Iranian emigrants to Norway